CS Mureșul Târgu Mureș was a Romanian football club based in Târgu Mureș. They reached twice the semifinals of Romania's top football league, Divizia A. They are the predecessors of CS Târgu Mureş.

History
Mureşul Târgu Mureş (named after the Mureș River, located in Târgu Mureș) was created in 1921 under the name SS Mureşul Târgu Mureş. In 1923, they joined to the CFR Târgu Mureş, Sports Club of railway workers, under the name CFR Mureşul Târgu Mureş. Same year, the club won the district championship Târgu Mureş and qualified for the final round of the Romanian championship. After victories against the Șoimii Sibiu and Venus București they reached the semifinals, but was defeated by Chinezul Timișoara with 0–9.

During 1924 it changed its name and became independent CS Mureşul Târgu Mureş. In 1932 they won the Championship of Center of Romania, newly created and re-qualified for the final rounds. They won against Crișana Oradea but in semifinals was defeated by reigning champions UD Reşiţa with 2–8.

During the World War II, the club ceased from any football competition.

In 1944, workers at the railway in Romania founded a new club under the name ASM Târgu Mureş, later CS Târgu Mureş, a new club to gather the best players in the city together.

In 1959 the club was revived under the name of Voinţa Târgu Mureş.

In September 1964, the club merged with ASA 1962 Târgu Mureș.

Chronology of names

CS Mureşul Târgu Mureş reappeared in 1959 under the name of Voinţa Târgu Mureş.

In 1964 they merged with ASA 1962 Târgu Mureș.

Honours

Liga I:

 Semifinals in Divizia A (2): 1923–24, 1931–32.
 7th place in the league format (1): 1933–34.

Liga II:

Winners (1): 1938–39
Runners-up (1): 1939–40

References

 Istoria fotbalului romanesc (The History of Romanian Football) vol I, 1909–1944

External links
 Labtof.ro
 Foot.dk
 Weltfussballarchiv.com

Defunct football clubs in Romania
Football clubs in Mureș County
1921 establishments in Romania
1964 disestablishments in Romania
Association football clubs established in 1921
Association football clubs disestablished in 1964